() is a West Germanic spring goddess. By way of the Germanic month bearing her name (Northumbrian: ,), she is the namesake of the festival of Easter in some languages. The Old English deity Ēostre is attested solely by Bede in his 8th-century work The Reckoning of Time, where Bede states that during  (the equivalent of April), pagan Anglo-Saxons had held feasts in 's honour, but that this tradition had died out by his time, replaced by the Christian Paschal month, a celebration of the resurrection of Jesus.

By way of linguistic reconstruction, the matter of a goddess called  in the Proto-Germanic language has been examined in detail since the foundation of Germanic philology in the 19th century by scholar Jacob Grimm and others. As the Germanic languages descend from Proto-Indo-European (PIE), historical linguists have traced the name to a Proto-Indo-European goddess of the dawn *, from which may descend the Common Germanic divinity at the origin of the Old English  and the Old High German .

Theories connecting  with records of Germanic Easter customs, including hares and eggs, have been proposed.

Name

Etymology 
The theonyms  (Old English) and *Ôstara (Old High German) are cognates – linguistic siblings stemming from a common origin. They derive from the Proto-Germanic theonym , itself a descendant of Proto-Indo-European (PIE) *h₂ews-reh₂- (cf. Baltic *auš(t)ra 'dawn, morning'), extended from the PIE root *, meaning 'to shine, glow (red)'. The modern English east also derives from this root, via the Proto-Germanic adverb *aust(e)raz ('east, eastwards'), from an earlier PIE *h₂ews-tero- ('east, towards the dawn').

According to linguist Guus Kroonen, the Germanic and Baltic languages replaced the old formation *h₂éws-os, the name of the PIE dawn-goddess, with a form in -reh₂-, likewise found in the Lithuanian deity Aušrinė. In Anglo-Saxon England, her springtime festival gave its name to a month (Northumbrian: , West Saxon: Eastermonað), the equivalent of April, then to the Christian feast of Easter that eventually displaced it. In southern Medieval Germany, the festival Ôstarûn similarly gave its name to the month Ôstarmânôth, and to the modern feast of Ostern ('Easter'), suggesting that a goddess named *Ôstara was also worshipped there. The name of the month survived into 18th-century German as Ostermonat. An Old Saxon equivalent of the spring goddess named *Āsteron may also be reconstructed from the term asteronhus, which is translated by most scholars as 'Easter-house', which would parallel the Medieval Flemish Paeshuys ('Easter-house'). Frankish historian Einhard also writes in his Vita Karoli Magni (early 9th c. AD) that after Charlemagne defeated and converted the continental Saxons to Christianity, he gave Germanic names to the Latin months of the year, which included the Easter-month Ostarmanoth.

The Old English  is therefore a distant cognate of numerous other dawn goddesses attested among Indo-European-speaking peoples, including Uṣás, Ēṓs, and Aurōra. In the words of the Encyclopedia of Indo-European Culture, "a Proto-Indo-European goddess of the dawn is supported both by the evidence of cognate names and the similarity of mythic representation of the dawn goddess among various Indo-European groups. [...] All of this evidence permits us to posit a Proto-Indo-European * 'goddess of dawn' who was characterized as a 'reluctant' bringer of light for which she is punished. In three of the Indo-European stocks, Baltic, Greek and Indo-Iranian, the existence of a Proto-Indo-European 'goddess of the dawn' is given additional linguistic support in that she is designated the 'daughter of heaven'."

Related names

A cluster of place names in England contain and a variety of English and continental Germanic names include the element *, an early Old English word reconstructed by linguists and potentially an earlier form of the goddess name . Such locations also include Eastry (788 CE) in Kent, Eastrea (966 CE) in Cambridgeshire, and Eastrington (959 CE) in the East Riding of Yorkshire.

The element * also appears in the Old English name , a name borne by Bede's monastery abbot in Wearmouth–Jarrow and which appears an additional three times in the Durham . Various continental Germanic names include the element, including Austrechild, Austrighysel, Austrovald, and Ostrulf.

They are datable to around 150-250 AD. Most of these inscriptions are in an incomplete state, yet many are at least reasonably legible. The name of these goddesses certainly derives from the stem austri-, which, if Germanic, would be cognate with the Old English Eostre, although the goddesses might equally have developed entirely independently.

Description by Saint Bede, 8th century
In chapter 15 ("The English months") of his 8th-century work  ("The Reckoning of Time"), Bede describes the indigenous month names of the English people.

Before the discovery of the matronae Austriahenae in 1958, scholarship on this topic frequently raised the question of whether Bede invented the deity.
In 1892, Charles J. Billson noted that scholars before his writing were divided about the existence of Bede's account of Ēostre, stating that "among authorities who have no doubt as to her existence are W. Grimm, Wackernagel, Sinrock , and Wolf. On the other hand, Weinhold rejects the idea on philological grounds, and so do Heinrich Leo and Hermann Oesre. Kuhn says, 'The Anglo-Saxon  looks like an invention of Bede;' and Mannhardt also dismisses her as an etymological ." Billson wrote that "the whole question turns ... upon Bede's credibility", and that "one is inclined to agree with Grimm, that it would be uncritical to saddle this eminent Father of the Church, who keeps Heathendom at arms' length and tells us less of than he knows, with the invention of this goddess." Billson pointed out that the Christianization of England started at the end of the 6th century, and, by the 7th, was completed. Billson argued that, as Bede was born in 672, Bede must have had opportunities to learn the names of the native goddesses of the Anglo-Saxons, "who were hardly extinct in his lifetime."

According to philologist Rudolf Simek in 1984, despite expressions of doubts, Bede's account of  should not be disregarded. Simek opined that a "spring-like fertility goddess" must be assumed rather than a "goddess of sunrise" regardless of the name, reasoning that "otherwise the Germanic goddesses (and matrons) are mostly connected with prosperity and growth". Simek pointed to a comparison with the goddess Rheda, also attested by Bede.

In 2011 Philip A. Shaw wrote that the subject has seen "a lengthy history of arguments for and against Bede's goddess , with some scholars taking fairly extreme positions on either side" and that some theories against the goddess have gained popular cultural prominence. Shaw noted that "much of this debate, however, was conducted in ignorance of a key piece of evidence, as it was not discovered until 1958. Most of these inscriptions are in an incomplete state, yet most are complete enough for reasonable clarity of the inscriptions. Shaw argued against a functional interpretation of the available evidence and concluded that "the etymological connections of her name suggests that her worshippers saw her geographical and social relationship with them as more central than any functions she may have had".

Theories and interpretations

Jacob Grimm
In his 1835 , Jacob Grimm cites comparative evidence to reconstruct a potential continental Germanic goddess whose name would have been preserved in the Old High German name of Easter, *. Addressing skepticism towards goddesses mentioned by Bede, Grimm comments that "there is nothing improbable in them, nay the first of them is justified by clear traces in the vocabularies of Germanic tribes." Specifically regarding , Grimm continues that:
The great Christian festival, which usually falls in April or the end of March, bears in the oldest of OHG remains the name  ... it is mostly found in the plural, because two days ... were kept at Easter. This , like the [Anglo-Saxon] , must in heathen religion have denoted a higher being, whose worship was so firmly rooted, that the Christian teachers tolerated the name, and applied it to one of their own grandest anniversaries.
Grimm notes that "all of the nations bordering on us have retained the Biblical ; even Ulphilas writes , not  ( not ), though he must have known the word". Grimm details that the Old High German adverb  "expresses movement towards the rising sun", as did the Old Norse term , and potentially also Anglo-Saxon  and Gothic . Grimm compares these terms to the identical Latin term , and contends that the cult of the goddess may have been centred around an Old Norse form, or that her cult may have already been extinct by the time of Christianization.

Grimm notes that the Old Norse Prose Edda book  attests to a male being called , whom he describes as a "spirit of light." Grimm additionally speculates on the nature of the goddess and surviving folk customs that may have been associated with her in Germany:
,  seems therefore to have been the divinity of the radiant dawn, of upspringing light, a spectacle that brings joy and blessing, whose meaning could be easily adapted by the resurrection-day of the Christian's God. Bonfires were lighted at Easter and according to popular belief of long standing, the moment the sun rises on Easter Sunday morning, he gives three joyful leaps, he dances for joy ... Water drawn on the Easter morning is, like that at Christmas, holy and healing ... here also heathen notions seems to have grafted themselves on great Christian festivals. Maidens clothed in white, who at Easter, at the season of returning spring, show themselves in clefts of the rock and on mountains, are suggestive of the ancient goddess.

But if we admit, goddesses, then, in addition to Nerthus,  has the strongest claim to consideration. To what we said on p. 290 I can add some significant facts. The heathen Easter had much in common with May-feast and the reception of spring, particularly in the matter of bonfires. Then, through long ages there seem to have lingered among the people Easter-games so-called, which the church itself had to tolerate : I allude especially to the custom of Easter eggs, and to the Easter tale which preachers told from the pulpit for the people's amusement, connecting it with Christian reminiscences.
Grimm commented on further Easter time customs, including unique sword dances and particular baked goods ("pastry of heathenish form"). In addition, Grimm weighed a potential connection to the Slavic spring goddess  and the Lithuanian .

According to anthropologist Krystal D'Costa, there is no evidence to connect the tradition of Easter eggs with Ostara. Eggs became a symbol in Christianity associated with rebirth as early as the 1st century AD, via the iconography of the Phoenix egg. D'Costa theorizes that eggs became associated with Easter specifically in medieval Europe, when eating them was prohibited during the fast of Lent. D'Costa highlights that a common practice in England at that time was for children to go door-to-door begging for eggs on the Saturday before Lent began. People handed out eggs as special treats for children prior to their fast.

Connection to Easter Hares

In Northern Europe, Easter imagery often involves hares and rabbits. The first scholar to make a connection between the goddess Eostre and hares was Adolf Holtzmann in his book Deutsche Mythologie. Holtzmann wrote of the tradition, "the Easter Hare is inexplicable to me, but probably the hare was the sacred animal of Ostara; just as there is a hare on the statue of Abnoba." In his late 19th-century study of the hare in folk custom and mythology, Charles J. Billson cited numerous incidents of folk customs involving hares around the Easter season in Northern Europe. Billson said that "whether there was a goddess named , or not, and whatever connection the hare may have had with the ritual of Saxon or British worship, there are good grounds for believing that the sacredness of this animal reaches back into an age still more remote, where it is probably a very important part of the great Spring Festival of the prehistoric inhabitants of this island."

Adolf Holtzmann had also speculated that "the hare must once have been a bird, because it lays eggs" in modern German folklore. From this statement, numerous later sources built a modern legend in which the goddess Eostre transformed a bird into an egg-laying hare. A response to a question about the origins of Easter hares in the 8 June 1889 issue of the journal American Notes and Queries stated: "In Germany and among the Pennsylvania Germans toy rabbits or hares made of canton flannel stuffed with cotton are given as gifts on Easter morning. The children are told that this Osh’ter has laid the Easter eggs. This curious idea is thus explained: The hare was originally a bird, and was changed into a quadruped by the goddess Ostara; in gratitude to Ostara or Eastre, the hare exercises its original bird function to lay eggs for the goddess on her festal day." According to folklorist Stephen Winick, by 1900, many popular sources had picked up the story of Eostre and the hare. One described the story as one of the oldest in mythology, "despite the fact that it was then less than twenty years old."

Some scholars have further linked customs and imagery involving hares to both  and the Norse goddess . Writing in 1972, John Andrew Boyle cited commentary contained within an etymology dictionary by A. Ernout and A. Meillet, where the authors write that "Little else ... is known about [], but it has been suggested that her lights, as goddess of the dawn, were carried by hares. And she certainly represented spring fecundity, and love and carnal pleasure that leads to fecundity." Boyle writes that "her carriage, we are told by Snorri, was drawn by a pair of cats — animals, it is true, which like hares were the familiars of witches, with whom  seems to have much in common." However, Boyle adds that "on the other hand, when the authors speak of the hare as the 'companion of Aphrodite and of satyrs and cupids' and point out that 'in the Middle Ages it appears beside the figure of Luxuria', they are on much surer ground and can adduce the evidence of their illustrations."

The earliest evidence for the Easter Hare (Osterhase) was recorded in south-west Germany in 1678 by the professor of medicine Georg Franck von Franckenau, but it remained unknown in other parts of Germany until the 18th century. Scholar Richard Sermon writes that "hares were frequently seen in gardens in spring, and thus may have served as a convenient explanation for the origin of the colored eggs hidden there for children. Alternatively, there is a European tradition that hares laid eggs, since a hare's scratch or form and a lapwing's nest look very similar, and both occur on grassland and are first seen in the spring. In the nineteenth century the influence of Easter cards, toys, and books was to make the Easter Hare/Rabbit popular throughout Europe. German immigrants then exported the custom to Britain and America where it evolved into the Easter Bunny."

In modern culture
The concept of * as reconstructed by Jacob Grimm and Adolf Holtzmann has had a strong influence on European culture since the 19th century, with many fanciful legends and associations growing up around the figure of the goddess in popular articles based on the speculation of these early folklorists.

A holiday named for the goddess is part of the neopagan Wiccan Wheel of the Year (Ostara, 21 March). In some forms of Germanic neopaganism,  (or Ostara) is venerated. Regarding this veneration, Carole M. Cusack comments that, among adherents,  is "associated with the coming of spring and the dawn, and her festival is celebrated at the spring equinox.

The name has been adopted for an asteroid (343 Ostara, 1892 by Max Wolf), In music, the name  has been adopted as a name by the musical group Ostara, and as the names of albums by :zoviet*france: (Eostre, 1984) and The Wishing Tree (Ostara, 2009).

In the first season of the TV series American Gods, based on the novel of the same name, Ostara is portrayed by Kristin Chenoweth. In the series, Ostara has survived into the modern age by forming an alliance with the Goddess of Media (Gillian Anderson) and capitalising on the Christian holiday. Odin (Ian McShane) forces her to accept that those who celebrate Easter are worshipping Jesus and not her, causing her to join his rebellion against the New Gods.

In 1853, Scottish protestant minister Alexander Hislop published The Two Babylons, an anti-Catholic tract. In the tract, Hislop connects modern English Easter with the East Semitic theonym Ishtar by way of folk etymology. For example, from The Two Babylons, third edition:
What means the term Easter itself? It is not a Christian name. It bears its Chaldean origin on its very forehead. Easter is nothing else than Astarte, one of the titles of Beltis, the queen of heaven, whose name, as pronounced by the people of Ninevah, was evidently identical with that now in common use in this country. This name as found by Layard on the Assyrian monuments, is Ishtar.
Because Hislop's claims have no linguistics foundation, his claims were rejected, but the Two Babylons would go on to have some influence in popular culture. In the 2000s, a popular Internet meme similarly claimed an incorrect linguistic connection between English Easter and Ishtar.

The Danish TV series Equinox has the concept of the Ostara and the Hare King as a central theme in the plot.

See also
 , a Germanic being associated with stars, the first element of whose name is cognate to 
 Dellingr, a potential personification of the dawn in Norse mythology
 , euhemerised Old English deities, possibly extending from Proto-Indo-European religion
 , the Old English "Mother's night," also attested by Bede
 Old High German lullaby, a lullaby in Old High German that mentions , generally held to be a literary forgery
 , the Old English extension of the Proto-Indo-European sky deity

Notes

References

 Anonymous (1859). Review: The Two Babylons in The Saturday Review, Vol. VIII, pp. 338–340. John W. Parker and Son.
 Barnhart, Robert K. (1995). The Barnhart Concise Dictionary of Etymology: The Origins of American English Words. HarperCollins. 
 Billson, Charles J. (1892). "The Easter Hare" as published in Folk-Lore, Vol. 3, No. 4 (December 1892). Taylor & Francis, Ltd. on behalf of Folklore Enterprises Ltd.
 
 Cusack, Carole M. (2008). "The Return of the Goddess: Mythology, Witchcraft and Feminist Spirituality" as published in Pizza, Murphy. Lewis, James R. (Editors). Handbook of Contemporary Paganism. Brill Publishers. 
 Diesel, Andreas. Gerten, Dieter (2007). Looking for Europe: . Index Verlag. 
 Grimm, Jacob (James Steven Stallybrass Trans.) (1882). Teutonic Mythology: Translated from the Fourth Edition with Notes and Appendix Vol. I. London: George Bell and Sons.
 Grimm, Jacob (James Steven Stallybrass Trans.) (1883). Teutonic Mythology: Translated from the Fourth Edition with Notes and Appendix Vol. II. London: George Bell and Sons.
 Hislop, Alexander (1903). The Two Babylons. Third edition. S.W. Partridge. Web.
 Hubbard, Benjamin Jerome. Hatfield, John T. Santucci, James A. (2007). An Educator's Classroom Guide to America's Religious Beliefs and Practices. Libraries Unlimited. 
 Giles, John Allen (1843). The Complete Works of the Venerable Bede, in the Original Latin, Collated with the Manuscripts, and Various Print Editions, Accompanied by a New English Translation of the Historical Works, and a Life of the Author. Vol. VI: Scientific Tracts and Appendix. London: Whittaker and Co., Ave Maria Lane.
 
 
 
 
 Schmadel, Lutz D. (2003). Dictionary of Minor Planet Names, fifth edition, illustrated. Springer. 
 Sievers, Eduard (Albert S. Cook Ed. Trans.) (1903) An Old English grammar Third Edition. Ginn and Company
 
 Wallis, Faith (Trans.) (1999). Bede: The Reckoning of Time. Liverpool University Press. 
 Watkins, Calvert (2006 [2000]). The American Heritage Dictionary of Indo-European Roots. Houghton Mifflin Harcourt. 
 
 Wright, Joseph and Wright, Elisabeth Mary. (1914) Old English Grammar Second Edition. Humphrey Milford Oxford University Press

Further reading
 
 

Anglo-Saxon goddesses
Dawn goddesses
Early Germanic calendar
Early Germanic festivals
Germanic goddesses
H₂éwsōs
March observances
Personifications of weather
Spring deities